Apolima Tai is a small village settlement on the tiny volcanic island of Apolima in Samoa. The village is situated on the north side of the islet which is in the political district of Aiga-i-le-Tai.

The village population is 96.

Apolima island is one of three isles in the Apolima Strait lying between the country's two main islands Upolu and Savai'i. The other islands in the strait are Manono which has four village settlements and the tiny uninhabited islet of Nu'ulopa.

References

Populated places in Aiga-i-le-Tai